Pawan Gupta is an Indian biotechnologist, immunobiologist, cell biologist and a Senior principal scientist at the Institute of Microbial Technology of the Council of Scientific and Industrial Research. He is known for his studies on Nuclear Receptors in Chronic Inflammatory Disorders and host-pathogen interaction of Mycobacterium tuberculosis. His studies have been documented by way of a number of articles and ResearchGate, an online repository of scientific articles has listed 66 of them. The Department of Biotechnology of the Government of India awarded him the DBT IYBA Award in 2009 and National Bioscience Award for Career Development, one of the highest Indian science awards, for his contributions to biosciences, in 2015.

Selected bibliography 
Nanduri, R., Kalra, R., Bhagyaraj, E., Chacko, A.P., Ahuja, N., Tiwari, D., Kumar, S., Jain, M., Parkesh, R., and Gupta, P. (2019) AutophagySMDB: a curated database of small molecules that modulate protein targets regulating autophagy. Autophagy 15, 1280-1295.

Chandra, V., Bhagyaraj, E., Nanduri, R., Ahuja, N., and Gupta, P. (2015) NR1D1 ameliorates Mycobacterium tuberculosis clearance through regulation of autophagy. Autophagy 11, 1987-1997

Kalra, R., Bhagyaraj, E., Tiwari, D., Nanduri, R., Chacko, A.P., Jain, M., Mahajan, S., Khatri, N., and Gupta, P. (2018) AIRE promotes androgen-independent prostate cancer by directly regulating IL-6 and modulating tumor microenvironment. Oncogenesis 7, 43.

Bhagyaraj, E., Tiwari, D., Ahuja, N., Nanduri, R., Saini, A., Kalra, R., Kumar, S., Janmeja, A.K., and Gupta, P. (2018) A human xenobiotic nuclear receptor contributes to nonresponsiveness of Mycobacterium tuberculosis to the antituberculosis drug rifampicin. Journal of Biological Chemistry 293, 3747-3757

Bhagyaraj, E., Nanduri, R., Saini, A., Dkhar, H. K., Ahuja, N., Chandra, V., Mahajan, S., Kalra, R., Tiwari, D., Sharma, C., Janmeja, A. K., and Gupta, P. (2016) Human Xenobiotic Nuclear Receptor PXR Augments Mycobacterium tuberculosis Survival. J Immunol 197, 244-255

Notes

References

External links 
 

N-BIOS Prize recipients
Living people
Indian medical academics
Indian medical writers
Scientists from Punjab, India
Indian biochemists
Indian cell biologists
Indian immunologists
1975 births